"Planets" is a song by Australian pop punk band, Short Stack. It was released on 24 September 2010. as the second single from the band's second studio album, This Is Bat Country. "Planets" debuted at number 4 on the ARIA Charts and was certified platinum in Australia in 2011.

To coincide with the release, Short Stack performed the song live at Federation Square in Melbourne. The event was televised live on Sunrise.

Music video
The music video for "Planets" was spread between two songs, "Planets" and "We Dance to a Different Disco, Honey" such as in My Chemical Romance's songs "Na Na Na (Na Na Na Na Na Na Na Na Na)" and "Sing", and features the band in a fancy club with people wearing masks, and the members taking the masks off to reveal their identity, also with scenes of a lady torturing another lady by licking her. At the end of the video the lady being tortured reveals that something is hidden at the place that the band is at. Guitarist/Vocalist Shaun Diviney eventually takes off a statue's mask, revealing a white lady with no mouth. Security guards then block Diviney and the lady's path and captures them. The story is then continued in "We Dance to a Different Disco, Honey". There are also scenes of Short Stack playing a in a large room with flashing purple lights.

Track listing

Charts

Weekly charts

Year-end charts

Certification

Personnel
Short Stack
Shaun Diviney – guitar, vocals
Andy Clemmensen – bass guitar, vocals
Bradie Webb – drums, keyboard

References

2010 singles
2010 songs
Short Stack songs